Jeremy Hobson is an American national radio journalist. He had been the co-host of NPR and WBUR's Here and Now. He co-hosted the show, along with Robin Young and Tonya Mosley. He left the show in October 2020.

Education and personal life
A native of Urbana, Illinois, Hobson graduated from University High School in 1999 and received his undergraduate degree from Boston University. He is the son of pianist Ian Hobson. Hobson identifies as gay, and was the first openly LGBT person to host a WBUR program.

Career
Prior to his tenure at NPR, Hobson worked at NPR member stations WCAI (Cape Cod, Massachusetts), WILL (Urbana, Illinois), and Rhode Island Public Radio, as a reporter and local show host. He has also been a producer for NPR’s All Things Considered, Day to Day and Wait Wait... Don't Tell Me!. Hobson hosted the Marketplace Morning Report from 2011 to 2013.

References

External links
NPR Biography
Here and Now Website

Living people
American male journalists
Boston University alumni
NPR personalities
People from Urbana, Illinois
Journalists from Illinois
Place of birth missing (living people)
Year of birth missing (living people)
Gay men
American LGBT journalists
American radio journalists
University Laboratory High School (Urbana, Illinois) alumni